Zoltán Váczi (born 5 February 1966 in Hungary) is a Hungarian retired footballer.

References

Hungarian footballers
Living people
1966 births
Association football midfielders
Hungary international footballers
Debreceni VSC players
Békéscsaba 1912 Előre footballers
Vasas SC players
Budapest Honvéd FC players
Ferencvárosi TC footballers